Eastwood is a census-designated place (CDP) in Bossier Parish, Louisiana, United States. The population was 4,093 at the 2010 census. It is part of the Shreveport–Bossier City Metropolitan Statistical Area.

Geography
Eastwood is located at  (32.557317, -93.568480). It is bordered to the west by the Red Chute CDP, and the town of Haughton is nearby to the southeast. U.S. Routes 80 and 79 pass east–west through the center of Eastwood, and Interstate 20 forms the southern edge of the CDP but with no direct access to it.

Demographics

2020 census

As of the 2020 United States census, there were 4,390 people, 1,673 households, and 1,232 families residing in the CDP.

2000 census
As of the census of 2000, there were 3,374 people, 1,225 households, and 957 families residing in the CDP. The racial makeup of the CDP was 90.60% White, 6.14% African American, 0.56% Native American, 0.65% Asian, 0.03% Pacific Islander, 0.47% from other races, and 1.54% from two or more races. Hispanic or Latino of any race were 1.96% of the population.

There were 1,225 households, out of which 38.9% had children under the age of 18 living with them, 63.9% were married couples living together, 10.3% had a female householder with no husband present, and 21.8% were non-families. 17.3% of all households were made up of individuals, and 6.4% had someone living alone who was 65 years of age or older. The average household size was 2.75 and the average family size was 3.10.

In the CDP, the population was spread out, with 29.2% under the age of 18, 7.4% from 18 to 24, 30.9% from 25 to 44, 21.5% from 45 to 64, and 11.2% who were 65 years of age or older. The median age was 35 years. For every 100 females, there were 96.8 males. For every 100 females age 18 and over, there were 93.8 males.

The median income for a household in the CDP was $48,370, and the median income for a family was $55,625. Males had a median income of $35,076 versus $23,682 for females. The per capita income for the CDP was $18,952. About 5.5% of families and 7.2% of the population were below the poverty line, including 7.9% of those under age 18 and none of those age 65 or over.

References

Census-designated places in Bossier Parish, Louisiana
Census-designated places in Louisiana
Census-designated places in Shreveport – Bossier City metropolitan area